Tashmoo was the name of two steamships:

, a side-wheeler steamboat that operated between 1899 and 1936 on Great Lakes
, a Design 1023 ship that later served in the Imperial Japanese Navy during World War II as Takusei Maru

Ship names